The Swatch FIVB World Tour 2003 was the official international beach volleyball tour for 2003.

The USA won five out of the 12 women's tournaments, but Brazil won nine out of the ten men's tournaments.

Grand Slam
There were four Grand Slam tournaments. These events give a higher number of points and more money than the rest of the tournaments.
 Berlin, GermanyVodafone Grand Slam, 24–29 June 2003
 Marseille, FranceWorld Series 13 Grand Slam, 15–20 July 2003
 Klagenfurt, AustriaA1 Grand Slam presented by Nokia, 30 July–3 August 2003
 Carson, California, USANissan Grand Slam, 18–21 September 2003

Schedule
Key

Tournament results

Women

Men

Rankings

Men

Women

Medal table by country

References

External links
 Beach Volleyball Database
 2003 Swatch FIVB World Tour - tour calendar at FIVB.org

2003 in beach volleyball
2003